Gwladys Evan Morris (7 June 1879 – 6 March 1957) was a Welsh stage actress and writer.

Acting career

Morris was born in Wrexham, Denbighshire, Wales. Her acting career began in 1903, when she went on a tour to the West Indies and India with Frank Benson's company. She also travelled to the United States, Ireland, Nova Scotia, and New Zealand. She mainly acted in plays by George Bernard Shaw, whom she greatly admired. From 1916 to 1920, she appeared in Shakespearean plays with the Henry Jewett Players, and then in London theatres from 1920 on. In 1929, Morris toured with the Macdona Company. In 1931, she played Vera Lyndon in Strange Orchestra at the Embassy Theatre, and in 1937 was in After October at the Criterion Theatre and the Aldwych Theatre. She retired in 1939.

Writing career

She wrote Tales from Bernard Shaw, which was first published in 1929 by George G. Harrap and Co. of London, and was printed by H & J Pillans & Wilson of Edinburgh.  A U.S. edition was published in 1929 by Frederick A. Stokes of New York.

In the introduction to the book, Morris explains that the character of Jack (a chattering monkey in her story of Man and Superman) is Shaw himself, and that the woman's part in another of her stories (Captain Brassbound's Conversion) is written "expressly for and round the personality of Ellen Terry", a famous actress of the day who had died, a year before publication, in 1928.

Bibliography
Tales from Bernard Shaw. (1929)

References

1879 births
1957 deaths
19th-century Welsh people
19th-century Welsh women
20th-century Welsh actresses
20th-century Welsh writers
20th-century Welsh women writers
Welsh stage actresses
People from Wrexham